Events from the year 1719 in Denmark.

Incumbents
 Monarch – Frederick IV
 Grand Chancellor – Christian Christophersen Sehested

Events

Undated
 The first lottery in Denmark is held. The prizes are royal land lots.

Births
 23 October – Peter Fenger (died 1774)

Deaths
 17 January – Sophie Amalie Moth, royal mistress (born 1654)
 22 September – Hans Schack, 2nd Count of Schackenborg (born 1676)

References

 
1710s in Denmark
Denmark
Years of the 18th century in Denmark